Paramunida is a genus of squat lobsters in the family Munididae, containing the following species:

 Paramunida amphitrita Macpherson, 1996
 Paramunida antipodes Ahyong & Poore, 2004
 Paramunida belone Macpherson, 1993
 Paramunida cretata Macpherson, 1996
 Paramunida cristata Macpherson, 2004
 Paramunida curvata Macpherson, 2004
 Paramunida echinata Macpherson, 2000
 Paramunida evexa Macpherson, 1993
 Paramunida granulata (Henderson, 1885)
 Paramunida hawaiiensis (Baba, 1981)
 Paramunida labis Macpherson, 1996
 Paramunida longior Baba, 1988
 Paramunida luminata Macpherson, 1996
 Paramunida pictura Macpherson, 1993
 Paramunida polita Macpherson, 1993
 Paramunida pronoe Macpherson, 1993
 Paramunida proxima (Henderson, 1885)
 Paramunida scabra (Henderson, 1885)
 Paramunida setigera Baba, 1988
 Paramunida spatula Macpherson, 2006
 Paramunida stichas Macpherson, 1993
 Paramunida thalie Macpherson, 1993
 Paramunida tricarinata (Alcock, 1894)

References

Squat lobsters